Akhdu Ala is a sub-district located in the Maqbanah District, Taiz Governorate, Yemen. Akhdu Ala had a population of 8,477 according to the 2004 census.

References  

Sub-districts in Maqbanah District